Prafulla Chhajed is an Indian chartered accountant and the former president of the Institute of Chartered Accountants of India for the year 2019–2020.

See also 
Institute of Chartered Accountants of India#Controversy

References 

Indian accountants
Living people
Year of birth missing (living people)
Place of birth missing (living people)